Priya Anna Kurian is a New Zealand political science academic. She is currently a full professor at the University of Waikato.

Academic career

After several years working as a reporter in India, Kurian completed a 1995 PhD titled  'Gender and environmental policy: A feminist evaluation of environmental impact assessment and the World Bank.'  at the Purdue University, they then moved to the University of Waikato, rising to full professor.

Kurian is married to fellow Waikato professor Debashish Munshi.

Selected works 
 Bartlett, Robert V., and Priya A. Kurian. "The theory of environmental impact assessment: implicit models of policy making." Policy & Politics 27, no. 4 (1999): 415–433.
 Bhavnani, Kum-Kum, John Foran, and Priya A. Kurian. "An introduction to women culture and development." (2003): 1-21.
 Kurian, Priya A. Engendering the environment? Gender in the World Bank's environmental policies. Routledge, 2018.
 Bhavnani, Kum-Kum, John Foran, and Priya A. Kurian. "Introduction: from the edges of development." In On the Edges of Development, pp. 15–24. Routledge, 2009.
 Bartlett, Robert V., Priya A. Kurian, and Madhu Malik, eds. International Organizations and Environmental Policy. No. 355. Greenwood Publishing Group, 1995.

References

External links
 
 

Living people
Year of birth missing (living people)
New Zealand women academics
Purdue University alumni
Academic staff of the University of Waikato
New Zealand political scientists
Indian emigrants to New Zealand
Women political scientists
New Zealand women writers